Crn Vrv may refer to:

 Maja e zezë (Crn Vrv), a mountain in Kosovo and Macedonia
 Crn Vrv, Studeničani, a village in the Republic of Macedonia